Poienești is a commune in Vaslui County, Western Moldavia, Romania. It is composed of seven villages: Dealu Secării, Florești, Frasinu, Poienești, Fundu Văii, Oprișița and Poienești-Deal. Although legally part of Poienești, Dealu Secării and Florești villages are administered by Alexandru Vlahuță Commune.

References

Communes in Vaslui County
Localities in Western Moldavia